Nicholas Zackary Heart is an Australian television and film personality. Heart is recognised as a television host, Wildlife Expert, conservationist, and actor. As of late 2016, Heart currently has a wildlife show broadcasting on BidChat.com called The Outback Zack Show.

Early life 

Heart studying Zoology and Conservation Biology at NMIT with further studies in ethology and wildlife management. He played baseball with the Fitzroy Lions from an early age up until 17, whilst also becoming a talented golfer achieving a handicap of 4. Heart's main interest was animals and spent his childhood working in the field with his father up until his father was killed in a vehicle accident.

Heart moved into the television and film world at age 17, becoming a professional stunt man with the New Generation Stunts Agency. Heart was trained under the Sanford Meisner acting technique by veteran Australian actress Vikki Blanche, and continued under Australian icon John Orcsik at The Australian Film and Television Academy.

Career 

Heart began his career as a stuntman, actor and model at age 17 and debuted on Australian television portraying the criminal "Mackay" in the Seven Network Australian Television series Blue Heelers, which aired for 13 seasons. Heart followed this with the role of the locally well known Pizza Delivery Boy witness on the Seven Network Australia's Most Wanted and went on with recurring stunt actor roles on the Network Ten soap opera Neighbours, and the Australian Broadcasting Corporation hit series Mercury with Geoffrey Rush.

In 1995 Heart made his film debut on the American action film Silver Strand, with Gil Bellows, Nicollette Sheridan, and director George Miller. He followed this film in the role of 'Skinny' the skinhead in the Australian feature film comedy Crackers. Heart performed his own stunts as the character.

In 2009 he received public recognition for Channel 31 Australia C31, broadcasts of Outback Zack's Australian Animal Fire Victims Appeal. Heart wrote, produced, and hosted the one-hour television special which raised up to $500,000.00 for the non-profit animal rescue organisation Wildlife Victoria with broadcasts in Australia and the United States. Heart co-host The Daily Buzz show.

In 2010 Heart relocated from Australia to Hollywood, and became known by audiences as the regular host on Planet X Television appearing in 12 episodes with his "Outback Zack" persona, and starring in American vehicle commercials.''

Filmography

References

External links 
 

Living people
People from Melbourne
Australian television presenters
Australian male actors
Year of birth missing (living people)